; (born August 20, 1977 in Hamburg, Germany) is a Japanese gymnast. He was raised in Tokyo. He is the 2004 Summer Olympics gold medalist in the team event and the bronze medalist in the high bar.

External links
 

1977 births
Living people
Japanese male artistic gymnasts
Olympic gymnasts of Japan
Gymnasts at the 2004 Summer Olympics
Olympic gold medalists for Japan
Olympic bronze medalists for Japan
Sportspeople from Hamburg
Gymnasts from Tokyo
Olympic medalists in gymnastics
Medalists at the 2004 Summer Olympics
Asian Games medalists in gymnastics
Gymnasts at the 1998 Asian Games
Asian Games bronze medalists for Japan
Medalists at the 1998 Asian Games
20th-century Japanese people
21st-century Japanese people